Mercato Shopping Mall is a shopping centre in the Jumeirah area of Dubai, United Arab Emirates. The mall is designed to look like a Mediterranean town during the European Renaissance in Italy. Opening in 2002,  the name "mercato" comes from the Italian word meaning "market."

Stores include:
Axiom Telecom
PAUL
Spinneys
Beauty By Edge
Borders
The Little Things
Sand Dollar Dubai

Gallery

External links
 Official Website
 Mercato Mall Shops

References

Shopping malls established in 2002
Shopping malls in Dubai
2002 establishments in the United Arab Emirates